Efe Güven (born January 31, 1985) is a Turkish professional basketball coach.He is the head coach of Galatasaray.

Career
In the statement made on 27 April 2022, it was announced that Güven, who has been the Head Coach of Galatasaray since 2018, parted ways.

References

External links
 Efe Güven at Galatasaray.org

1985 births
Living people
Turkish basketball coaches
Galatasaray S.K. (women's basketball) coaches